Madrasa Manzar-e-Islam, also known as Jamia Razvia Manzar-e-Islam, is an Islamic seminary in India. It was founded in 1904 in Bareilly, India by Ahmed Raza Khan Barelvi.
It celebrated its hundredth anniversary in 2004 this occasion was marked by a series of publications in monthly magazine Ala Hazrat
whose editor in chief is Subhan Raza Khan Subhani Mian.

He also prepared a plan to upgrade the madrasa in view of the shortage of space.

Famous Fatawa
In September 2007 Darul Ifta of Manzar-e-Islam issued a fatwa, which declaring the Indian film actor Salman Khan and his family as non-Muslims after they were shown on TV placing Ganesh (a Hindu elephant deity) in their house and worshipping it. The clerics of the Darul Ifta stated in their fatwa that Islam prohibits idol worship and the actor would have to recite the Shahadah in order to become Muslims again. However, a Mufti of Manzar-e-Islam clarified that "they were asked their opinion about Muslims who worship idols and participates in idol worshipping processions, nowhere Salman Khan or his recent act was mentioned. The rule of Islam regarding idol worshipping is quite clear and this act is considered non-Islamic therefore any Muslim involved in worshipping anyone besides Allah need to recite Kalma again" and that the question was general and not specific to any person.
In February 2015 the madrasa issued a fatwa against Azam Khan a Minister of  Uttar Pradesh on his proposal to build a temple for his party president Mulayam Singh Yadav. The madrasa said "In Islam believing in anyone other than Allah is illegitimate and so talking about building a temple is equally wrong,"

See also
Jamiatur Raza
Al Jamiatul Ashrafia
Al-Jame-atul-Islamia

References

Islamic universities and colleges in India
Barelvi Islamic universities and colleges
1904 establishments in India
Madrasas in India
Memorials to Ahmed Raza Khan Barelvi